Aelia Eudocia Augusta (401460 AD), also called Saint Eudocia, was an Eastern Roman empress by marriage to Emperor Theodosius II (r. 408–450), and a prominent Greek historical figure in understanding the rise of Christianity during the beginning of the Byzantine Empire. Eudocia lived in a world where Greek paganism and Christianity existed side by side with both pagans and non-orthodox Christians being persecuted. Although Eudocia's work has been mostly ignored by modern scholars, her poetry and literary work are great examples of how her Christian faith and Greek heritage/upbringing were intertwined, exemplifying a legacy that the Roman Empire left behind on the Christian world.

Early life
Aelia Eudocia was born circa 400 in Athens into a family of Greek descent. Her father, a Greek philosopher named Leontius, taught rhetoric at the Academy of Athens, where people from all over the Mediterranean came to either teach or learn. Eudocia's given name was Athenais, chosen by her parents in honour of the city's protector, the pagan goddess Pallas Athena. Her father was rich and had a magnificent house on the Acropolis with a large courtyard in which young Athenais frequently played as a child.

When Athenais was 12 years old, her mother died and she became her father's comfort, taking on the responsibilities of household chores, raising her siblings and tending to her father. She had two brothers, Gessius and Valerius, who would later receive honours at court from their sister and brother-in-law. In return for her household activities, her father spent time giving her a thorough training in rhetoric, literature and philosophy. He taught her the Socratic virtue of knowledge of moderation, and predicted that she would have a great destiny. She had a gift for memorisation, and easily learned the poetry of Homer and Pindar, which her father would recite to her. Both as a teacher and a role model, he had a great impact on her, prepared her for her destiny and influenced the literary work she created after she became Empress.

When he died in 420, she was devastated. In his will, he left all his property to her brothers, with only 100 coins reserved for her, saying that "[s]ufficient for her is her destiny, which will be the greatest of any woman." Athenais had been her father's confidante and had expected more than this meager 100-coin inheritance. She begged her brothers to be fair and give her an equal share of their father's property, but they refused.

Shortly after her father's death, at the age of 20, Athenais went to live with her aunt, who advised her to go to Constantinople and "ask for justice from the Emperor", confident she would receive her fair share of her father's wealth.  John Malalas later gave a more detailed account of her mother's history. As summarised in The History of the Decline and Fall of the Roman Empire by Edward Gibbon:

Later historians have tended to reject the above account as too reminiscent of a fairy tale or a romance novel to be historically accurate. The exact circumstances of the introduction of Eudocia to Theodosius II and Pulcheria are unknown. The historical study Theodosian Empresses. Women and Imperial Dominion in Late Antiquity (1982) by Kenneth Holum, further introduced the suggestion that Leontius was a native of Antioch rather than Athens, drawing from the "traditional link" between the two cities and their philosophers. The argument is considered doubtful as the building activity of Eudocia in the 420s focused on Athens rather than Antioch.

Life as an empress

Marriage

Legend has it that when Theodosius (b. 401) was 20 years old, he wanted to get married. He talked to his sister Pulcheria, who began to search for a maiden fit for her brother, that was of either "patrician or imperial blood." His longtime childhood friend, Paulinus, also helped Theodosius in his search.  The Emperor's search had begun fortuitously at the same time that Athenais had arrived in Constantinople. Pulcheria had heard about this young woman, who had only 100 coins to her name, and when she met her, she was "astonished at her beauty and at the intelligence and sophistication with which she presented her grievance." Upon reporting back to her brother, she told him she had "found a young girl, a Greek maid, very beautiful, pure and dainty, eloquent as well, the daughter of a philosopher", and young Theodosius, who was full of desire, fell in love instantly.

Athenais had been raised pagan, and upon her marriage to Theodosius II converted to Christianity and was renamed Eudocia. They were married on 7 June 421, and there were "reports that Theodosius celebrated his wedding with chariot races in the hippodrome". Her brothers, who had rejected her after their father's death, fled since they were fearful of the punishment they thought they were going to receive when they learned that she became empress.  Eudocia instead called them to Constantinople, and Theodosius rewarded them. The emperor made Gessius praetorian prefect of Illyricum and made Valerius magister officiorum. Both Gessius and Valerius were rewarded because Eudocia believed that their mistreatment of her was part of her destiny. Theodosius also honoured his best friend, Paulinus, with the title of magister officiorum, for he had helped find his wife.

This rags-to-riches story, though it claims to be authentic and is accepted among historians, leads one to believe that the tale may have been twisted due to the detail of how the romance was portrayed. The earliest version of this story appeared more than a century after Eudocia's death in the "World Chronicle" of John Malalas, "an author who did not always distinguish between authentic history and a popular memory of events infused with folk-tale motifs". The facts are that she was the daughter of Leontius and she did originally have the name Athenais, according to the contemporary historians Socrates of Constantinople, and Priscus of Panion; however, they leave out any mention of Pulcheria's role in playing match-maker for her brother. The historians Sozomen and Theodoret did not include Eudocia in their respective historical works, perhaps because they wrote after 443 when Eudocia had fallen into disgrace.

Blending Christianity with classical culture
While on her pilgrimage to Jerusalem in spring of 438, Eudocia stopped in Antioch, and during her stay she addressed the senate of that city in Hellenic style (i.e., an encomium cast in Homeric hexameters) and distributed funds for the repair of its buildings. She was very conscious of her Greek heritage, as demonstrated in her famous address to the citizens of Antioch where she quoted a famous line by Homer: "ὑμετέρης γενεής τε καὶ αἵματος εὔχομαι εἶναι" ("Of your proud line and blood I claim to be"). These last words of Eudocia's oration brought loud acclaim from the listeners, which resulted in the citizens of Antioch celebrating the Empress Eudocia's Christian Hellenism and commemorating her by erecting a golden statue of her in the curia and a bronze statue in the museum. On her return, her position was undermined by the jealousy of Pulcheria and the groundless suspicion of an intrigue with her protégé, Paulinus, the master of the offices.

The historical study Theodosian Empresses: Women and Imperial Dominion in Late Antiquity (1982) by Kenneth Holum, further introduced the suggestion that her father, Leontius, was a native of Antioch rather than Athens, drawing from the "traditional link" between the two cities and their philosophers. The argument is considered doubtful as the building activity of Eudocia in the 420s focused on Athens rather than Antioch. Holum suggests that Eudocia may have been named after the great city of Athens, but she would have been born in Antioch. She even convinced her husband to "extend the walls of Antioch to take in a large suburb". Furthermore, she also influenced state policy towards pagans and Jews under her husband's reign, and used the powerful influence she had to protect them from persecution. Eudocia also advocated for "reorganization and expansion" of education in Constantinople. Eudocia had been raised and educated in traditional and classical sophist education from Athens, but her goal was to blend classical pagan education with Christianity. This was her way of using her power as empress to honour teachers and education, something that was very important to her in her life.

Eudocia also built the original Church of St. Polyeuctus in Constantinople, which her great-granddaughter Anicia Juliana greatly expanded and furnished in the 6th century.

Children
Eudocia had three children with Theodosius II. Licinia Eudoxia, born in 422, was the oldest. Licinia Eudoxia had been betrothed to her cousin, the Western Roman emperor Valentinian III since her birth, whom she married on 29 October 437. The second child, Flaccilla, died in 431. Arcadius was the only son and died in infancy. Only a year after she gave birth to her first child, Eudocia was proclaimed Augusta by her husband on 2 January 423.

Pilgrimage to Jerusalem (438–439)

Upon being named Augusta, she succeeded her sister-in-law, Pulcheria, who had been Augusta since 414. The relationship between the two women consisted of rivalry over power. Eudocia was jealous over the amount of power Pulcheria had within the court, while Pulcheria was jealous of the power Eudocia could claim from her. Their relationship created a "pious atmosphere" in the imperial court, and probably explains why Eudocia travelled to the Holy Land in 438. Eudocia went on a pilgrimage to Jerusalem in 438, bringing back with her holy relics to prove her faith. Her relationship with her husband had deteriorated, and with much pleading from Melania, a wealthy widow from Palestine and good friend of Eudocia, Theodosius allowed her to go.

Banishment
Around 443, Eudocia left the palace for reasons that cannot be fully ascertained. One rumor has it that Eudocia was banished from the court towards the latter part of her life for adultery. Theodosius suspected that she was having an affair with his long-time childhood friend and court advisor, Paulinus. According to Malalas's account of this story, Theodosius II had given Eudocia a very large Phrygian apple as a gift. One day Paulinus had shown the emperor the same apple, not knowing that the emperor had given it to Eudocia as a gift. Theodosius recognized the apple and confronted Eudocia who had sworn she had eaten it. Eudocia's denials made the emperor believe that she had fallen in love with Paulinus and was having an affair, and had given his best friend the same apple he had given to her as a symbol of his love. Theodosius had Paulinus executed and Eudocia, embarrassed, decided to leave the court in 443.

On the other hand, Marcellinus' version suggests intrigues of Theodosius and Eudocia against each other: on Theodosius' orders, comes domesticorum Saturninus killed two allies of the empress, and in revenge, she went on to have Saturninus assassinated. Theodosius subsequently deprived Eudocia of her royal attendants, prompting her to leave the palace. Whatever the cause of her departure may be, she still retained her wealth and the title Augusta.

In Jerusalem (443–460)
Eudocia returned to Jerusalem in circa 443, where she lived for the last part of her life. In Jerusalem she focused on her writing. Here she was accused of the murder of an officer sent to kill two of her followers, for which she suffered the loss of her imperial staff; she nevertheless retained great influence. Although involved in the revolt of the Syriac Monophysites (453), she was ultimately reconciled to Pulcheria and readmitted into the Eastern Orthodox Church. She died an Orthodox Christian in Jerusalem on 20 October 460, having devoted her last years to literature. She was buried in Jerusalem in the Church of Saint Stephen, one of the churches she had herself built in Jerusalem (modern St. Stephen's Basilica now stands at the site). The empress never returned to the imperial court in Constantinople, but "she maintained her imperial dignity and engaged in substantial euergetistic programs."

Literary work

Soon after her accession as an empress, Eudocia wrote a hexameter poem eulogizing the Roman performance in the Persian wars of 421–22. The work is now lost. While Eudocia could have written a lot of literature after leaving the court, only some of her work survived. Eudocia "wrote in hexameters, which is the verse of epic poetry, on Christian themes". She wrote a poem entitled The Martyrdom of St. Cyprian in three books, of which 900 lines survived, and an inscription of a poem on the baths at Hamat Gader. Her most studied piece of literature is her Homeric cento, which has been analyzed recently by a few modern scholars, such as Mark Usher and Brian Sowers. Eudocia is an understudied poet and has been neglected due to "lack of complete and authoritative text".

Martyrdom of St. Cyprian
There are three books (or volumes) to this epic poem, which tells the story of how "Justa, the Christian virgin, defeated the magician Cyprian through her faith in God. Cyprian had been hired by Aglaidas to force Justa to love him. It ends with the conversion of Cyprian, his swift rise to the rank of Bishop, and Justa becoming a deaconess, with the new name, Justina." She later became known as Justina of Antioch. This story is all fiction, although the parallels between Eudocia's character Justa and Eudocia herself are interesting, as both of them converted to Christianity and changed their names upon succeeding to power. Although some of the text has been lost, most of it has been paraphrased by Photius. The poem is very long despite not all of it surviving the centuries, and can be found in Women Writers of Ancient Greece and Rome (2004) edited by Michael Ian Plant.

The Hamat Gader poem
The poem inscribed on the baths at Hamat Gader was very short, and can be included here, as evidence of her hexameter writing style. The poem was inscribed so visitors could read it as they went into the pool.

The line "Of the Empress Eudocia" flanked by two crosses is set above the poem. This title line was added after the carving of the main inscription, making room for some doubt whether the poem was indeed authored by Eudocia. Clibanus is the name given to the source of the hot water. After praising his qualities and those of his many springs ("the thousandfold swell"), the poem enumerates "four-fold four", thus sixteen different parts of the bath complex, fourteen of which bear a name; these names include Hygieia (the pagan goddess of health), a whole range of pagan personal names, "holy Elijah" referring to the prophet, and two refer to Christians – a nun and a patriarch.

Homeric centos
The Homeric centos that Eudocia composed are her most popular poems, as well as those most analyzed by modern scholars, because Homer was a popular choice on which to write a cento. Eudocia's centos are the longest Homeric centos, and consist of 2,344 lines. These centos are a clear representation of who Eudocia was, and what she believed in—an epic poem combining her Athenian classical educational background, but adding stories from the book of Genesis and the New Testament stories of the life of Jesus Christ.

Mark Usher analyzed this poem as a way to understand why Eudocia chose to use Homeric themes as a means to express her biblical interpretations. According to Usher, Eudocia needed to convey human experience relating to the Bible.  She used themes from the Iliad and Odyssey because "they contained all Eudocia needed to tell the Gospel story. Whenever and wherever Eudocia needed to express greatness, pain, truthfulness, deceit, beauty, suffering, mourning, recognition, understanding, fear, or astonishment, there was an apt Homeric line or passage ready in her memory to be recalled." Eudocia's Homeric poetry is essential to understanding her as a Christian woman in the Eastern Roman Empire, and understanding her role as empress. Her classical educational background is clearly seen in her poetry, which captures her literary talent. She made a point to connect her background love for studying classical Greek literature to her Christian beliefs.

Legacy
Eudocia is regarded as saint. Her feast day is 13 August.

The plot of Antonio Vivaldi's opera Atenaide is based on the courtship and marriage of Eudocia and Theodosius.
 
Eudocia is a featured figure on Judy Chicago's installation piece The Dinner Party, being represented as one of the 999 names on the Heritage Floor.

See also

List of Byzantine emperors
List of Roman and Byzantine Empresses

References

Citations

Sources

External links

 

400s births
460 deaths
Year of birth uncertain
Roman-era Athenian women
Theodosian dynasty
Greek Roman Catholic saints
5th-century Christian saints
Byzantine Athenians
5th-century Byzantine empresses
5th-century women writers
5th-century Byzantine writers
Ancient Greek women poets
Byzantine women writers
Aelii
Augustae
Theodosius II
Converts to Christianity from pagan religions
Saints from Roman Greece
Female saints